Sutton High School can refer to:

Sutton High School, London, girls' school in Sutton, London, United Kingdom 
Sutton High School, Plymouth in Sutton, Plymouth, Devon, United Kingdom
Sutton High School (Nebraska) in Sutton, Nebraska, United States
Sutton High School (Massachusetts) in Sutton, Massachusetts, United States
Sutton District High School in Sutton, Ontario, Canada

Also:

Sutton High Sports College, former name of The Sutton Academy, in St Helens, Merseyside, United Kingdom